DL Skateboards is a skateboard company based in Topanga Canyon, California, United States (US). Founded in 2011 by artist and skateboarding couple Derek Mabra and Lauren Andino, the original versions of the skateboards were created in their Brooklyn, NY apartment.

Mabra, a former woodworker, shapes each solid oak skateboard by hand, and Andino does the painting.  The artwork is inspired by the California surf scene of the 1960s, showcasing minimal, surfboard-like designs. Mabra and Andino are advocates for American-made small businesses and were featured in The Wall Street Journals "Made In America: Holiday Gift Guide" in 2012.

In 2014 The Daily Beast called the skateboards "cult favorites". Andino was also featured in a Marie Claire Magazine article as one of "5 Women Running the Show Behind Iconic Male Brands" Mabra and Andino's lifestyle and business was also profiled in a short documentary created by Cool Hunting.

References

Companies based in Los Angeles County, California
Companies established in 2011
Skateboarding companies